The Triglav Lakes Valley is a rocky hanging valley in the Julian Alps in Slovenia, below the sheer sides of Mount Tičarica and Mount Zelnarica southwest of Triglav. The valley is also called the Seven Lakes Valley, although there are ten and not seven lakes in the valley. It is above the tree line and is geologically alpine karst; therefore it has also been termed the Sea of Stone Valley.

Lakes
The Alpine newt (Ichthyosaura alpestris), endemic to the Alps, lives in it. Below Mount Tičarica (elevation ) there are two interconnected lakes known as the Double Lake. At an elevation of  lies the Big Lake or the Lake Ledvica (literally: Lake Kidney). It has the shape of a kidney and is the largest and the deepest of these lakes.

Mountain huts

There are two mountain lodges in the Triglav Lakes Valley. The Triglav Lakes Lodge, owned by the Ljubljana-Matica Hilwalking Club, is located at its southern edge, whereas the Central Sava Lodge at Prehodavci, operated by the Radeče Alpine Club, is located at its northern edge. They are two hours apart. They may be accessed from Bohinj over the Komna Plateau (5 hours to the Triglav Lakes Lodge), from Bohinj over the Komarča Crag (3 hours), from the Blato Pasture (3:30 hours), from Trenta (3 hours to the Central Sava Valley Lodge, and over Trebiščina Pasture (3:30 hours to the Central Sava Valley Lodge).

Cultural significance
The designer Marko Pogačnik stylised the Triglav Lakes Valley in the Slovenian coat of arms with two wavy lines under the silhouette of Triglav.

References

External links

 
Valleys in Upper Carniola
Valleys of the Julian Alps
Triglav National Park
Sava basin
Municipality of Bohinj
Municipality of Bovec